Hepingli Subdistrict is a residential neighborhood and a subdistrict of Dongcheng District, Beijing. It is situated in the northeastern part of the city between the northern 2nd Ring Road and the northern 3rd Ring Road.  The neighborhood is bordered by Andingmen Waidajie to the west and Hepingli Dongjie to the east. 

Hepingli has 102,227 residents in 2020, and comprises 20 residential areas or zones.  Most apartment buildings were built in the 1950s to 1960s. In the early 2000s, most buildings were repainted.

History and Name

Heplingli, meaning “a place of peace”, was named in 1952 during the Asia and Pacific Rim Peace Conference which was held in Beijing.

Below is a table summarizing the changes in the administrative status of the land within Hepingli:

Administrative Division 

As of 2021, there are 20 communities within the subdistrict:

Transportation

Hepingli is served by Lines 5 and 13 of the Beijing Subway.  Line 5 traverses the neighborhood from north to south with stops at Heping West Bridge and Hepingli Beijie.  Line 13 stops near eastern Hepingli at Liufang.

Main city bus routes through Hepingli include 13, 18, 62, 75, 104, 108, 116, 117, 119, 124, 125, 127, 407, 430, and 特16.

The Heping West and East Bridges on the 3rd Ring Road are named after Heplingli. The Hepingli Railway Station was replaced by the Liufang Station of the Line 13.  The area has an expressway link—the Jingcheng Expressway connects to Hepingli at Taiyanggong Bridge.

Landmarks 
 Temple of Earth
 Qingnianhu Park

See also
List of township-level divisions of Beijing

External Link 
Official website (Archived)

References

Dongcheng District, Beijing
Subdistricts of Beijing
Neighbourhoods of Beijing